Sveinn Teitsson (1 March 1931 – 4 March 2017) was an Icelandic footballer. He played in 23 matches for the Iceland national football team from 1953 to 1964.

References

External links
 

1931 births
2017 deaths
Sveinn Teitsson
Sveinn Teitsson
Association footballers not categorized by position